Green Arrow is a DC Comics superhero character

Green Arrow may also refer to:
 Green Arrow (Connor Hawke), a DC Comics superhero character, son of the first Green Arrow
 Oliver Queen (Arrowverse), a character in the Arrowverse television and web series franchise whose alter ego is Green Arrow
 "Green Arrow" (Arrow episode), an episode of the television series Arrow
 DC Showcase: Green Arrow, a 2010 short animated film
 LNER Class V2 4771 Green Arrow, a steam locomotive

See also
 Green Arrow: Year One, a 2007 DC Comics limited series
 Green Arrow: The Longbow Hunters, a 1987 DC Comics comic book miniseries
 Green Arrows, an Italian hardcore punk band